Ernst Hiller (19 November 1928 – 27 February 2008) was a former Grand Prix motorcycle road racer from Germany. His best year was in 1958 when he finished the season in seventh place in the 500cc world championship.

References

1928 births
2008 deaths
German motorcycle racers
500cc World Championship riders
Place of birth missing